Tertius Daniller (born 4 August 1989 in Paarl) is a South African rugby union player, who most recently played with . His usually plays as a loose-forward.

Career

Youth
He represented the  team in 2008 and the  team in 2009 and 2010.

Western Province
That was his only appearance that season, but in the 2011 Vodacom Cup campaign, he made seven starts, which also led to his inclusion in the squad for the 2011 Currie Cup Premier Division.

Free State Cheetahs

Griffons

Varsity Cup
He also represented  in the 2010, 2011 and 2012 Varsity Cup competitions.

Personal
Tertius Daniller is the younger brother of long-time  full-back Hennie Daniller.

References

South African rugby union players
Living people
1989 births
Sportspeople from Paarl
Free State Cheetahs players
Griffons (rugby union) players
Western Province (rugby union) players
Rugby union flankers
Rugby union players from the Western Cape